Tibok-tibok (Pampangan: tibuktíbuk) or carabao-milk pudding is a Pampangan dessert pudding made primarily from carabao milk and ground soaked glutinous rice (galapong). Originating in the Philippine province of Pampanga, it is especially popular in Cagayan. It has a soft jelly-like texture and is topped with latik (coconut curds) before serving. It is characteristically creamy white in color and has a delicate, sweet and slightly salty flavor. It is very similar to the more common maja blanca, albeit the latter is made with coconut milk and cornstarch.

Etymology
The name tibok-tibok literally means "[like a] heartbeat". This is due to the method of determining if the dish is cooked. Once it has reduced to a firm consistency, the bubbles barely break the surface, making it look like it is pulsating.

Preparation
Tibok-tibok is prepared similarly to maja blanca. Carabao milk is traditionally mixed with a small amount of galapong, ground glutinous rice that has been soaked overnight. It is flavored with a small amount of white sugar and dayap (key lime) zest. It is simmered at low heat while stirring continuously until the mixture thickens. It is immediately poured into a flat pan lined with greased banana leaves and allowed to cool. It can also be poured into molds as desired. It is usually served as square or diamond-shaped slices. It is topped with latik (coconut curds). It is stored in airtight containers to prevent it from drying out.

Carabao milk can be substituted with whole fat cow's milk in areas where it is not available. Less traditional preparations might also substitute rice flour or cornstarch for galapong, or exclude it altogether.

See also
Kesong puti
Espasol
Leche flan
Sapin-sapin

References

Philippine desserts
Puddings